Lo Lung Hang is a valley northwest of Hung Hom, Kowloon City District, Hong Kong. The place is west of Hok Yuen and it is where the Valley Road Estate was once located. The valley is less visible now, but there is still a street remaining called Lo Lung Hang Street, near Hung Hom MTR station.
A railway station named Ho Man Tin station has been built in Lo Lung Hang as part of the Sha Tin to Central Link and Kwun Tong line Extension.

History
At the time of the 1911 census, the population of Lo Lung Hang was 204. The number of males was 178.

Streets in Lo Lung Hang
Chatham Road North
Gillies Avenue North
Ko Shan Road
Valley Road
Yan Fung Street

Public and community facilities
Fat Kwong Street Playground
Ko Shan Road Park
Ko Shan Theatre
Tsing Chau Street Playground

Education
Educational institutions in Lo Lung Hang include:
Holy Angels Canossian School

References